826 Naval Air Squadron was a Fleet Air Arm aircraft squadron formed during World War II which has been reformed several times since then until last disbanded in 1993.

History

Second World War
No. 826 Squadron was formed at RNAS Ford in Sussex as a torpedo bomber squadron equipped with 12 Fairey Albacore biplanes. After initial training it was placed under the operational control of RAF Coastal Command, flying its first mission, a daylight bombing raid against a road junction at Nieuwpoort, Belgium on 31 May 1940. The squadron continued to fly a mixture of convoy escort missions, daylight attacks against German land and sea targets and nighttime patrols against German E-boats until the Albacore was grounded on 3 July 1940 owing to the unreliability of the aircraft's Bristol Taurus engines. This resulted in the Squadron being temporarily re-equipped with the older Fairey Swordfish until the Albacore was returned  to use in August. From August to October 1940, the Squadron carried out more convoy escort patrols and raids against barges being massed by the Germans  in the Channel ports in preparation for Operation Sealion. On 7 October the squadron left Coastal Command control to undertake more training in preparation for carrier-based operations. From May to October, the Squadron dropped 55.5 tons of bombs and seven tons of mines, escorted over 100 convoys. It claimed two Messerschmitt Bf 109 fighters shot down for the loss of five Albacores.

In November 1940, the squadron embarked on the newly commissioned aircraft carrier , which sailed for the Mediterranean via South Africa and the Red Sea, the squadron flying attacks against Massawa in Italian-ruled Eritrea on the way. On 26 May 1941, following an attack on an airfield on Karpathos, Formidable was badly damaged by German bombers, and was withdrawn from operations for repair, with 826 Squadron being detached for land-based operations.

The Squadron was then deployed on night bombing raids over the Western Desert in support of the Eighth Army, before being transferred (along with 815 Squadron) to Nicosia, Cyprus for operations against Vichy French naval forces during the Syria–Lebanon Campaign on 28 June 1941. The squadron returned to North Africa on 15 July, and continued to carry night bombing attacks until early 1942, when it returned to the torpedo bomber role, operating from Berka in Libya to attack Italian convoys. The Squadron continued to carry out both anti-shipping and bombing missions in support of the army for much of the rest of 1942, adding the role of dropping flares to illuminate targets for Vickers Wellington bombers, participating in both the first and second Battles of El Alamein. Following the British victory at El Alamein, the squadron continued to fly anti-shipping and convoy escort missions until disbanded on 25 August 1943.

826 Naval Air Squadron reformed on 1 December 1943 at RNAS Lee-on-Solent equipped with the Fairey Barracuda torpedo bomber as part of No 9 Torpedo-Bomber-Reconnaissance (TBR) Wing. The Squadron was again disbanded on 13 October 1944.

Post War

Canada
It re-equipped with Fairey Firefly fighter bombers in January 1946, but was disbanded on 26 February 1946, as delays to the completion of Magnificent meant that the squadron was not yet needed. The squadron reformed on 1 June 1947 as part of the Royal Canadian Navy, equipped with Fairey Fireflys, operating both from Magnificent and HMCS Warrior. It re-equipped with Grumman TBM Avenger anti-submarine aircraft in June 1950. On 1 May 1951, the squadron was renamed 881 Squadron (RCN), later VS 881.

Reformation

826 Squadron reformed as part of the Fleet Air Arm in May 1951, equipped with Firefly Mk 5 (soon replaced by Firefly AS. Mk.6) in the anti-submarine role. The Squadron flew its Fireflys off the carriers , Theseus and Glory, before re-equipping with the new Fairey Gannet anti-submarine aircraft in January 1955, becoming the first squadron to operate the Gannet. It embarked aboard HMS Eagle but disbanded in November 1955.

Helicopters
It then deployed detachments aboard the Replenishment oilers  and   before deploying aboard  in 1969. The squadron disbanded at RNAS Culdrose on 25 March 1970.

It was reformed a sixth time on 2 June 1970 with Westland Sea Kings, serving on HMS Eagle until the carrier decommissioned in January 1972. The squadron then operated from the helicopter training ship  and from December 1972, from the cruiser . It continued to operate its Sea Kings from Tiger until 1978, when it transferred to the carrier , receiving Sea King HAS.5s in March 1981, and embarking on Hermes in September that year. (Bulwark having been paid off in March 1981.)

Following the Argentinian invasion of the Falkland Islands in April 1982, the squadron, equipped with nine Sea King HAS.5s, deployed aboard Hermes as part of the Operation Corporate Task Force sent to retake the Islands. Four Sea Kings were transferred to the stores ship  to free up space aboard Hermes on 17 May. The Squadron lost two helicopters during the Falklands War, but on both occasions the crews escaped unharmed.

After the end of the war, the Squadron was split into a number of independent flights operating from Royal Fleet Auxiliary ships, and deployed in turn to the South Atlantic, these operations continuing until 1986. After that period, the Squadron was split into 4 flights of two Sea Kings each, operating from Type 22 frigates, RFAs and aircraft carriers as required.

In December 1990, just prior to the start of the First Gulf War, 826 C Flight, commanded by Lt Cdr Kevin Williamson RN, deployed to the Middle East to take over the two D Flight Sea King helicopters already on station in the region - they were the only helicopters and crews deployed into the Gulf from RNAS Culdrose. The ASW equipment (SONAR and LAPADS equipment) normally fitted had been removed and prototype equipment designed to detect shallow moored mines was fitted instead. This equipment, called 'Demon Camera', was largely ineffective in the waters of the Gulf and the crews reverted to spotting moored and floating mines visually from heights of around 500 feet. The mines were then destroyed by RN EOD divers deployed directly from the helicopters in a low hover and recovered by winch. The C Flight crews returned to RNAS Culdrose in April 1991, after handing their Sea Kings back to 826 D flight personnel who then subsequently took part in flood relief operations off Bangladesh.

After the squadron's aircraft had been reallocated to 810 Naval Air Squadron and 819 Naval Air Squadron the squadron was again disbanded in July 1993.

Aircraft operated

References

Citations

Bibliography
 Brown, David. Carrier Air Groups, Volume 1: HMS Eagle . Windsor, UK: Hylton Lacy Ltd., 1972. .
 Burden, Rodney A., Michael A. Draper, Douglas A. Rough, Colin A Smith and David Wilton. Falklands: The Air War. Twickenham, UK: British Air Review Group, 1986. .
 Chesneau, Roger. Aircraft Carriers of the World, 1914 to the Present: An Illustrated Encyclopedia.London: Bloomsbury Press, 1998. .
 Howard, Lee, Burrow, Mick and Myall, Eric. Fleet Air Arm Helicopters since 1943. Tonbridge: Air-Britain (Historians) Ltd, 2011. .
 Sturtivant, Ray. and Ballance, Theo. The Squadrons of The Fleet Air Arm. Tonbridge, Kent, UK: Air-Britain (Historians) Ltd, 1994. .

External links
Fleet Air Arm 826 squadron
 826 squadron Fleet Air Arm 1940 to 1993
881 Squadron Royal Canadian Navy

800 series Fleet Air Arm squadrons
Military of the United Kingdom in Cornwall